My Inspiration is a studio album by Filipino singer Jake Zyrus. It was released on May 1, 2009 and is credited under the name Charice, which Zyrus used prior to his gender transition. It is a concept cover album dedicated to his mother Racquel Pempengco. In addition to nine cover versions, the album features one original song, "Always You", written by the Metropop Song Festival and Awit Award-winning songwriter Jonathan Manalo. The album has been certified platinum. Like his previous release, the album was also made available for digital download through Amazon.com MP3 Download on June 23, 2009. Some package versions include a second CD, which features a karaoke version of every song.

Track listing

Bonus tracks:

References 

2009 debut albums
Jake Zyrus albums
Star Music albums
Concept albums
Covers albums